Zyganisus propedia is a moth in the family Cossidae. It is found in Australia, where it has been recorded from Victoria, South Australia and southern Western Australia. The habitat consists of lowland coastal forests, dry forests and heathland.

The wingspan is 44–52 mm for males and 58 mm for females. The forewings are mottled light grey to grey, with black strigulae (fine streaks) and lines. The hindwings are light grey with dark lines and a distinct discal spot. Adults are on wing from late April to mid-June.

Etymology
The species name refers to the early appearance of the species and is derived from Latin propediem (meaning prematurely).

References

Natural History Museum Lepidoptera generic names catalog

Cossinae
Moths described in 2012